is a former Japanese football player. He played for Japan national team.

Club career
Matsunaga was born in Shizuoka Prefecture on August 8, 1948. After graduating from Waseda University, he joined Hitachi in 1971. In 1972, the club won the champions in Japan Soccer League and Emperor's Cup. The club also won 1975 Emperor's Cup and 1976 JSL Cup. He scored many goals in early 1970s and competed with Kunishige Kamamoto for top scorer. Matsunaga retired in 1982. He played 176 games and scored 82 goals in the league and became a top scorer in 1972 and 1973. He was also selected Best Eleven for 4 years in a row (1972-1975).

National team career
In May 1973, Matsunaga was selected Japan national team for 1974 World Cup qualification. At this qualification, on May 22, he debuted against Hong Kong. He also played at 1976 Summer Olympics qualification. This qualification was his last game for Japan. He played 10 games and scored 2 goals for Japan until 1976.

Club statistics

National team statistics

Personal honors
Japan Soccer League Division 1 Top Scorer - 1972, 1973

References

External links
 
 Japan National Football Team Database

1948 births
Living people
Waseda University alumni
Association football people from Shizuoka Prefecture
Japanese footballers
Japan international footballers
Japan Soccer League players
Kashiwa Reysol players
Japanese football managers
Association football forwards